Obi Moneke (born November 2, 1983) is a Nigerian footballer.

Moneke was a member of Nigerian Beach Soccer National team in 2007 FIFA Beach Soccer World Cup.

Club career
Moneke played for Armenian football club Kilikia F.C. for two seasons where he made 30 appearances and scored one goal.

Moneke moved to China and signed a contract with Henan Construction as an appendage of Polish striker Emmanuel Olisadebe in 2008. He scored his first CSL goal on 9 April to put Henan Construction 1-1 up against Dalian Shide.

References

External links
 
 Player stats at sohu.com

1984 births
Living people
Nigerian footballers
Nigerian expatriate footballers
Association football midfielders
Kano Pillars F.C. players
Expatriate footballers in China
Chinese Super League players
China League One players
Henan Songshan Longmen F.C. players
Guizhou F.C. players
Nigerian expatriate sportspeople in China
Sportspeople from Ibadan